The 2012 Baltic Cup was a football competition which was held on 1–3 June 2012 in Estonia.

Format
For the first time, Finland took part in the competition. As a result of this, the round-robin format was changed to knock-out tournament, as Latvia did not agree to play more than two matches. As a result of this, penalty shoot-outs were used to decide the winner if a match was drawn after 90 minutes.

Stadiums
Tamme Stadium in Tartu was used for the matches involving Estonia and Võru Stadium in Võru was the host for the other two matches. Tehvandi Stadium in Otepää and Viljandi linnastaadion in Viljandi were also to be used, but were unavailable for the time period.

Results

Matches

Semi-finals

Third place match

Final

Winners

Statistics

Goalscorers

See also
Balkan Cup
Nordic Football Championship

References

Baltic Cup (football)
Baltic Cup
Baltic Cup
Baltic Cup
Baltic Cup
International association football competitions hosted by Estonia